Avoca is an unincorporated community in Hamilton County, Florida, United States.

Geography
Avoca is located at latitude 30.578 and longitude -83.027 and its elevation is 118 feet. Surrounding state roads include State Road 150 and State Road 390. The surrounding US Highway is Highway 129. A map of the community can be found here.

Avoca was a turpentine/farming community for many years. Farming and plantation operations created the small community and Turpentine maintained it later. In 1916 it was a prosperous community located in Hamilton County Florida around the junction of CR 150 and US HWY 129. Hebron Cemetery supported the community and Church was held at Bakers Mill. Miller's Crossing was a few miles from Avoca. Leonard Ezekiel "L.E." Miller had a substantial plantation farm there and housed the commissary or general store where Boots (Brogans), Jeans, mostly overalls, Georgia knits (socks) and hickory striped shirts were sold and nearly uniform wear in the area. The community had several schools in a four to five mile area.

Nearby locations

References

External links
Avoca Populated Place Profile / Hamilton County, Florida Data
Avoca, Hamilton County, Florida, United States: Maps

Unincorporated communities in Hamilton County, Florida
Unincorporated communities in Florida